The Immediate Geographic Region of Pouso Alegre is one of the 10 immediate geographic regions in the Intermediate Geographic Region of Pouso Alegre, one of the 70 immediate geographic regions in the Brazilian state of Minas Gerais and one of the 509 of Brazil, created by the National Institute of Geography and Statistics (IBGE) in 2017.

Municipalities 
It comprises 34 municipalities.

 Albertina    
 Bom Repouso   
 Borda da Mata   
 Bueno Brandão  
 Cachoeira de Minas   
 Camanducaia   
 Cambuí   
 Careaçu    
 Conceição dos Ouros    
 Congonhal  
 Consolação  
 Córrego do Bom Jesus  
 Espírito Santo do Dourado 
 Estiva  
 Extrema   
 Heliodora   
 Inconfidentes 
 Ipuiuna   
 Itapeva   
 Jacutinga     
 Monte Sião    
 Munhoz   
 Natércia
 Ouro Fino    
 Pouso Alegre    
 Santa Rita do Sapucaí   
 São João da Mata    
 São Sebastião da Bela Vista   
 Senador Amaral   
 Senador José Bento   
 Silvianópolis   
 Tocos do Moji  
 Toledo 
 Turvolândia

See also 

 List of Intermediate and Immediate Geographic Regions of Minas Gerais

References 

Geography of Minas Gerais